Rabbi Ya'akov Moshe Toledano (18 August 1880 – 15 October 1960) was an Israeli rabbi who served as Minister of Religions for two brief periods between 1958 and 1960. He also served as chief rabbi of Cairo, Alexandria and Tel Aviv.

Biography
Toledano was born on 18 August 1880 in Tiberias, then in the Ottoman Empire. He was the son of Rabbi Yehuda Toledano who had immigrated from Meknes in 1862 and grew up to become known as a public figure in Tiberias. He was a member of the city council and the head of the Mizrachi party in the city. For four years, Toledano lived among the Jewish minority in the Galilee, where he was among the founders of a Hebrew school in Peki'in.

During World War I Toledano received French citizenship after being expelled by the Ottoman authorities and lived in Corsica with 800 other members of the Galilee's Jewish community. He served as rabbi for the local Jewish community on the island, and dedicated himself to improving Jewish life there. In 1920 the French government allowed the community to return to the Galilee. After returning to Tiberias, Toledano purchased land from the local Arabs around the Tomb of Maimonides and the Tomb of Rabbi Akiva, building a wall around the Tomb of Maimonides and financing the establishments of several new neighborhoods.

Between 1926 and 1928 Toledano was a member of the Chief Rabbinate in Tangier, and was a member of the Beit Din for the Jewish community of the city. By 1941 he had been appointed as the head of the Beit Din and the deputy Chief Rabbi of Cairo, the head of the Beit Din in Alexandria and the member of the Beit Din of Egypt, roles in which he served in until his election as the Sephardi Chief Rabbi of Tel Aviv in 1942. He held this position until 1958, and along with the Ashkenazi Chief Rabbi, Isser Yehuda Unterman, helped found the Special Court of Agunot.

He left this job to become Minister of Religious Affairs in the eighth government on 3 December 1958, despite not being a member of the Knesset. He held the post until 30 November the following year. When David Ben-Gurion formed the ninth government on 17 December 1959, Toledano returned to his ministerial role, serving until his death from cardiac arrest in October 1960.

In July 1960, only a month before he died, he married Mary Sebag, a 20-year-old from moshav Tirosh. This marriage caused Toledano to receive criticism from much of the Israeli media, from which Toledano defended himself by saying that the marriage was legitimate because he had complied with the Jewish law that stated a man must wait for two holidays after the death of the first wife. Toledano also stated "I'm a man of eastern tradition, and did not base my marriage on European Jewish tastes, but according to Jewish law." Toledano has a street named after him in the Bavli neighborhood of Tel Aviv, along with the Prize for Jewish literature established by the Tel Aviv Religious Council.

Famous works and teachings
Toledano collected and studied many ancient manuscripts of the Jews of Spain and North Africa. One of the most famous manuscripts that he discovered was the commentary of the Rambam on the Mishnah in Arabic, as it had been originally written, which Toledano discovered along with his brother Baruch Toledano in Damascus. When he was living in Israel, Toledano collaborated with archaeologist Nahum Slouschz to help discover the hot springs in Tiberias built by the Romans. In 1950, Toledano was sent by the Hebrew University of Jerusalem to Morocco where he discovered several more ancient manuscripts.

Toledano was sympathetic to Zionism and wrote several commentaries pertaining to his opinion of the Three Oaths, in which he stated that Zionism does not contradict the Three Oaths. He supported the concept of Hebrew labor and stated that it was preferable for Jews to hire other Jews, including secular Jews in his ideas. Toledano also wrote a ruling in which it was forbidden for Jews to sell weapons to non-Jews in the state of Israel. He supported the creation of a high court in Jerusalem, and under appropriate conditions supported the revival of the Sanhedrin. Rabbi Toledano wrote several religious commentaries, winning the Rav Kook Prize in 1957 in the Special Award Category for his work.

External links
 

1880 births
1960 deaths
Sephardic Haredi rabbis in Israel
Chief rabbis of Tel Aviv
Israeli people of Moroccan-Jewish descent
Israeli Sephardi Jews
People from Tiberias
Mizrachi (political party) politicians
Ministers of Religious affairs of Israel
Chief rabbis of Cairo